Mohamed Boudiaf International Airport  is an airport in Algeria, located approximately  south of Constantine; about  east-southeast of Algiers.

History
The airport was built in 1943 as Constantine Airfield by the United States Army during the World War II North African Campaign. It was primarily a maintenance and supply depot for Air Technical Service Command and also served as headquarters for XII Bomber Command as a command and control base. It also was used as a command post for Allied Forces Command (AFHQ) for Free French, British and United States ground forces in Algeria in February 1943, under the command of General Sir Harold R. L. G. Alexander to coordinate the actions of the United States First Army advancing from the west and the British Eighth Army, advancing from the east against the German Afrika Korps. In 1944 it was turned over to the Algerian government and used occasionally by Air Transport Command aircraft on the North African route until the end of the war.

The airport is named for President Mohamed Boudiaf. Muhammad Boudiaf (June 23, 1919 – June 29, 1992) (Arabic: محمد بوضياف), also called Si Tayeb el Watani, was an Algerian political leader and a founder of the revolutionary National Liberation Front (FLN) that led the Algerian War of Independence (1954–1962).

Airlines and destinations
The following airlines operate regular scheduled and charter flights at Constantine Airport:

See also
Transport in Algeria
List of airports in Algeria

References

External links
EGSA-Constantine

Airports in Algeria
Transport in Constantine, Algeria
Airfields of the United States Army Air Forces in Algeria
World War II airfields in Algeria
Airports established in 1943
Buildings and structures in Constantine Province
1943 establishments in Algeria